Franco Zuculini (born 5 September 1990) is an Argentine footballer who plays as a defensive midfielder for Italian club SPAL.

Club career

Racing Club
Born in La Rioja, Zuculini made his professional debut with Racing Club de Avellaneda on 13 April 2008 at not yet 18, starting in a 1–0 home win against Arsenal de Sarandí for the Primera División championship.

He appeared in 29 league matches and scored two goals in his first full season, helping his team narrowly avoid relegation.

Hoffenheim
On 26 June 2009, Zuculini signed with TSG 1899 Hoffenheim in Germany. He appeared in only seven Bundesliga games during his short spell, scoring on 24 October in a 3–0 home victory over 1. FC Nürnberg after coming on as a second half substitute.

Subsequently, Zuculini began a series of loans which saw him appear for Genoa C.F.C. in Italy, former club Racing and Spain's Real Zaragoza.

Real Zaragoza
On 12 August 2011, Zaragoza announced the signing of Zuculini on a season-long loan, with a view to a permanent transfer later in the year. He made his La Liga debut 16 days later, starting and featuring 52 minutes in a 0–6 home loss to Real Madrid.

Zuculini agreed to a three-year deal with the Aragonese in the subsequent off-season, He opened his scoring account (two in all competitions) for the side on 10 December 2012 in a 2–0 away defeat of Rayo Vallecano which was also the 5,000 goal in their history, being released at the end of the campaign after it ended in relegation.

Arsenal de Sarandí
In February 2013, Zuculini suffered a knee ligament injury that ended his season. While recovering from the operation, Arsenal de Sarandí allowed him to get into exercise programs and train along with the team players; in January 2014, after a nearly one-year period of inactivity, he signed for six months with the club.

Return to Italy
On 8 July 2014, Zuculini joined Italian side Bologna F.C. 1909 on a two-year contract. He scored three times from 28 appearances in his first season, helping to promotion to Serie A.

Exactly two years after arriving at the Stadio Renato Dall'Ara, Zuculini returned to the Serie B when he signed for Hellas Verona F.C. as a free agent on a reported one-year contract, with an option for another year. On 12 July 2017, he agreed to a new two-year deal.

Later years
Zuculini returned to his homeland after four years on 27 July 2018, joining Club Atlético Colón for free. He went back to the Italian second division one year later, agreeing to a one-year deal at Venezia F.C. with an option for a second one. 

On 26 August 2021, he returned to Italy once again and signed a two-year contract with SPAL.

International career
In January 2009, Zuculini was selected for the Argentina under-20 team for the 2009 South American Youth Championship in Venezuela. He was named by full side manager Diego Maradona in a squad of 14 local players in late May of that year, and made his debut on the 20th – aged just 18 – in a friendly with Panama (3–1 win in Santa Fe).

Personal life
Zuculini's younger brother, Bruno, is also a footballer and a midfielder. He too represented Racing de Avellaneda.

References

External links
Argentine League statistics  

1990 births
Living people
Sportspeople from La Rioja Province, Argentina
Argentine footballers
Association football midfielders
Argentine Primera División players
Uruguayan Primera División players
Serie A players
Serie B players
La Liga players
Bundesliga players
Racing Club de Avellaneda footballers
Arsenal de Sarandí footballers
Club Atlético Colón footballers
TSG 1899 Hoffenheim players
Genoa C.F.C. players
Bologna F.C. 1909 players
Hellas Verona F.C. players
Venezia F.C. players
Real Zaragoza players
Defensor Sporting players
S.P.A.L. players
Argentina youth international footballers
Argentina under-20 international footballers
Argentina international footballers
Argentine expatriate footballers
Expatriate footballers in Germany
Expatriate footballers in Italy
Expatriate footballers in Spain
Expatriate footballers in Uruguay
Argentine expatriate sportspeople in Germany
Argentine expatriate sportspeople in Italy
Argentine expatriate sportspeople in Spain
Argentine expatriate sportspeople in Uruguay
Argentine people of Italian descent